

Roman empire

Poets
 Nemesianus (c. 283), Carthage, in Latin
 Oppian of Apamea, Syria, in Greek

Works

China

Poets (by date of birth)
 Xi Kang (223-262)
 Zhang Hua (232–300)
 Lu Ji (261-303), Kingdom of Wu

Works
 Zhang Hua, The Admonitions of the Instructress to the Court Ladies (292)

South Asia
 Eelattu Poothanthevanar, writing in Tamil

Decades and years

 
03
Poetry